= Hitachi eBworx =

Hitachi eBworx Sdn Bhd
- Company type: Private Limited Company
- Founded: 2 May 1998
- Headquarters: Petaling Jaya, Malaysia
- Parent: Hitachi
- Website: www.hitachi-ebworx.com

Hitachi eBworx Sdn Bhd is a consulting and technology solutions firm headquartered in Petaling Jaya, Malaysia. The firm provides credit management, touchpoint, and trade finance banking products and applications to the financial services sector.

== History ==
Hitachi eBworx was started as Digital Nervous System on 2 May 1998, by Tan Suan Fong and three other founders. During the first nine months, it was involved in a variety of software development work, including website design and complete projects such as the Personal Computer (PC) Order System for Gateway Asia Pacific. The company then focused on building products for the financial services industry and became known as "e-Business@work".

In 1999, CSE Infotech Limited of Singapore purchased a majority stake in DNS. The name of the company was changed to eBworx Malaysia Sendirian Berhad.

eBworx was granted MSC status on 11 February 2002 by the Government of Malaysia. It became a public company on 25 April 2003 and changed its name from eBworx Malaysia Sendirian Berhad to eBworx Berhad in June the same year. eBworx Berhad was listed on the ACE Market (previously MESDAQ) of Bursa Malaysia Securities Berhad on 17 November 2003.

In 2005, eBworx opened a research and development office in Chengdu, China. In 2011, the main shareholders of eBworx were CSE-Infotech Ltd, OSK Capital Partners Sdn Bhd and Tan.

In 2012, an offer was made by Hitachi, Ltd on March second to acquire eBworx at 90 sen per share. The offer was accepted, and eBworx became Hitachi eBworx, a subsidiary of Hitachi, Ltd. It is part of Hitachi's Financial Information Systems Division (FISD), of the group's larger Information and Telecommunications Systems Company.

== Products ==
"Digital Credit Management System" is an automated credit finder application which searches outsource agencies, manages credit underwriting and approval via web-based PCs and Mobile Tablets. In 2009, DCMS was named Best of Financial Application at the MSC Malaysia APICTA Awards and at the International APICTA Awards at Melbourne, Australia, and won a Financial Insights Innovation Award in 2010 with CIMB Bank Berhad.

eBworx "Digital Collection and Recovery System" is a web-based application which provides information about delinquent borrowers, to help the lender plan collection strategies. The company's "Digital Retail Internet Banking", an internet banking application for banking customers, won a Financial Insights Innovation Award in 2010 with PT Bank Danamon Indonesia.

"Digital Transaction Banker", a global cash management and trade finance initiation application, which organises information about a corporate portfolio across groups of companies, facilitates domestic and international payment and transfers and liquidity management. In 2011 the product won a Best of Financial Applications at the MSC Malaysia APICTA Awards and at the International APICTA Awards 2011 at Pattaya, Thailand.

"TradeSpring", a web-based backend trade processing application which provides bank’s customers with access to their trade accounts, transactions and statuses,

"Digital Mobile Banker", which provides banking solutions through mobile devices. It won a 2009 Financial Insights Innovation Award with OCBC for Mobile Banking.
